Clay is an unincorporated community in Adair County, in the U.S. state of Missouri.

History
A post office called Clay was established in 1894, and remained in operation until 1908. The community most likely was named for its location within Clay Township.

References

Unincorporated communities in Adair County, Missouri
1894 establishments in Missouri
Unincorporated communities in Missouri